Maria Mitkou (born 11 April 1994) is a Greek football midfielder currently playing for PAOK Thessaloniki in the Greek A Division.

She has represented Greece at the U17 and U19 levels. In April 2012 she scored her first official goal for the senior team against Macedonia at age 17.

International goals

Honours
Amazones Dramas
A Division(1): 2014

PAOK
A Division(4): 2019, 2020, 2021, 2022

References

External links

Maria Mitkou career statistics - https://globalsportsarchive.com/people/soccer/maria-mitkou/213893/

1994 births
Living people
Women's association football midfielders
Greek women's footballers
Greece women's international footballers
PAOK FC (women) players
Footballers from Drama, Greece